The Seville European Film Festival (SEFF) is an annual film festival dedicated to European cinema held in November in Seville, Spain, since 2004.

The festival is an initiative of the Instituto de la Cultura y las Artes de Sevilla (ICAS), which depends on the Ayuntamiento de Sevilla. It is supported by the ICAA and the sub-programme Europe Creative MEDIA. The festival has also traditionally served as staging ground for the announcement of the nominations to the European Film Academy's European Film Awards. Since 2013, it enjoys the collaboration from Filmin.

The top prize awarded at the festival is known as the 'Golden Giraldillo'.

The first edition took place on 6–13 November 2004.

Golden Giraldillo

References 

Events in Seville
Film festivals in Andalusia
November events
Autumn events in Spain